Chekiye is a village located in the Chümoukedima District of Nagaland and is a suburb of Chümoukedima, the district headquarters.

Demographics
Chekiye is situated in the Chümoukedima District of Nagaland. As per the Population Census 2011, there are a total 1293 households in Chekiye. The total population of Chekiye is 7105.

See also
Chümoukedima District

References

Villages in Chümoukedima district